Postplatyptilia nubleica is a moth of the family Pterophoridae. It is known from Argentina.

The wingspan is 18–21 mm. Adults are on wing in January.

References

nubleica
Moths described in 1991